Prabodh Chandra Sengupta (21 June 1876–1962) was a historian of ancient Indian astronomy. He was a Professor of Mathematics at Bethune College in Calcutta and a lecturer in Indian Astronomy and Mathematics at the University of Calcutta.

Early life
Prabodh Chandra Sengupta, the younger son of Ram Chandra Sengupta, was born in a village near Tangail in Mymensingh district (now in Bangladesh) on 21 June 1876. He had his early education in the Santosh Jahnavi H. E. School and passed the Entrance (Matric) examination with sufficient merit to obtain a scholarship.

Major works
 Ancient Indian chronology (1947)
 Khandakhadyaka: an astronomical treatise of Brahmagupta
 Āryabhaṭīya by Āryabhaṭa I
 Āryabhaṭa I, the father of Indian epicyclic astronomy
 Surya Siddhanta: a textbook of Hindu astronomy (along with Ebenezer Burgess, Phanindralal Gangooly)
 Greek and Hindu methods in spherical astronomy (1931)

References

External links
Full text of "Ancient Indian Chronology" 

19th-century Indian astronomers
1876 births
Scholars from Kolkata
1962 deaths
Historians of mathematics
19th-century Indian mathematicians
20th-century Indian mathematicians
Bengali scientists
Scientists from Kolkata
Writers from Kolkata
Indian social sciences writers
20th-century Indian historians
20th-century Indian astronomers
19th-century Indian historians